Nicole Perlman (born December 10, 1981) is an American screenwriter, best known for co-writing the Marvel Cinematic Universe film Guardians of the Galaxy (2014), and the story for Marvel's Captain Marvel (2019), and for Pokémon Detective Pikachu (2019).

Early life
Perlman was born in Boulder, Colorado, the daughter of Penny and Michael Perlman, a physician. She was raised Jewish. She grew up in Boulder, where she attended Boulder High School.
She studied film and dramatic writing at New York University's Tisch School of the Arts, where she graduated with a BFA in 2003. She won the Tribeca Film Festival's Sloan Grant for Science in Film for her screenplay Challenger.

Career
She was enrolled in Marvel's screenwriting program in 2009, during which time she was offered several of their lesser-known properties on which to base a screenplay. Out of those, Perlman chose Dan Abnett and Andy Lanning's Guardians of the Galaxy, due to her interest in space and science fiction. "I can’t tell you what the other titles were that [Marvel] were offering up on the table, but I can tell you that one of them was a little bit more appropriate for me, just based on gender," she says. "I think they were a little taken aback when I chose Guardians, because there were ones that would make a lot more sense if you were a romantic-comedy writer or something like that." Perlman spent two years writing a draft, immersing herself in the Guardians universe. In late 2011, Perlman was asked to create another draft, and in early 2012, American writer and director James Gunn was brought in to contribute to the script, and direct the film.

Perlman made her directorial debut in 2018 with The Slows, a short film which made its world premiere at Fantastic Fest and played at the New York Film Festival. It is adapted from a short story by Gail Hareven first published in The New Yorker. The film stars Annet Mahendru and Breeda Wool.

Perlman co-received a "story by" credit on Captain Marvel (2019).

She co-wrote an early script for the film Pokémon Detective Pikachu, with Gravity Falls creator Alex Hirsch. Eventually, she received a "story by" credit with Benji Samit and Dan Hernandez, while Hirsch was not credited.

Upcoming projects
In January 2016, Perlman announced that she is writing a sequel to Labyrinth alongside Fede Álvarez and Jay Basu. By October 2016, Warner Bros., Village Roadshow and Team Downey had put together a writers' room for the third of the Guy Ritchie Sherlock Holmes films, with Perlman, Justin Malen, Gary Whitta, Geneva Robertson-Dworet, and Kieran Fitzgerald included.

Filmography

Films

Short films

Films attached to with no release date 
Untitled Labyrinth sequel
M.A.S.K.: Mobile Armored Strike Kommand
Visionaries: Knights of the Magical Light
Untitled Fast & Furious spin-off

References

External links

 
 Dana Goodyear, Nicole Perlman Harnesses Her Superpowers, The New Yorker, January 14, 2019

1981 births
Living people
American women screenwriters
Hugo Award-winning writers
Jewish American screenwriters
Nebula Award winners
Place of birth missing (living people)
Tisch School of the Arts alumni
Writers from Boulder, Colorado